Register is a surname. It may refer to:

Cheri Register, American author and teacher
George Scott Register (1901–1972), American lawyer
John Register (1936–1996), American painter
Matthew Register, Canadian ice hockey player
Paul J. Register (1899–1941), United States Navy officer and namesake of more than one United States Navy ship
Sam Register, American television executive
Steven Register, American baseball player